Salem's Lot (also known as Salem's Lot: The Movie, Salem's Lot: The Miniseries and Blood Thirst) is a 1979 American two part horror miniseries television adaptation of the 1975 horror novel 'Salem's Lot by Stephen King. Directed by Tobe Hooper and starring David Soul and James Mason, the plot concerns a writer who returns to his hometown and discovers that its citizens are turning into vampires. Salem's Lot combines elements of the vampire film and haunted house subgenres of horror.

Plot
At a church in Guatemala, a man and a boy, Ben Mears and Mark Petrie, are filling small bottles with holy water. When one of the bottles begins to emit an eerie supernatural glow, Mears tells Mark that "they've found us again." Knowing an evil presence is nearby, they decide to stay to fight it.

Two years earlier, Mears, a successful author, returns after a long absence to his small hometown of Salem's Lot, Maine. Mears intends to write a book about the Marsten House, an old, ominous property on a hilltop which has a reputation for being haunted. Attempting to rent it, Mears finds that it has already been purchased by another new arrival in town, the mysterious Richard Straker, who is in the process of opening an antique shop with his oft-mentioned but never present business partner, Kurt Barlow. Instead, Mears moves into a boarding house in town run by Eva Miller and develops a romantic relationship with a local woman, Susan Norton. He befriends Susan's father, Dr. Bill Norton, and reconnects with his kindly former school teacher, Jason Burke. Mears tells Burke that he feels the Marsten House is somehow inherently evil, recalling that its original owner, Hubie Marsten – implied to have been a child molester – committed suicide there. Mears further recalls a traumatic childhood incident in which he broke into the house on a dare and saw Hubie's ghost.

After a large crate is delivered to the Marsten House one night, townspeople begin to disappear or die under strange circumstances. Mears and Straker are the main suspects as they are both new in town, but it eventually becomes clear that the crate contained Straker's business partner, Kurt Barlow — an ancient vampire who has come to Salem's Lot after sending Straker to make way for his arrival. Straker kidnaps a young boy, Ralphie Glick, as an offering to Barlow, while Barlow himself kills local realtor Larry Crockett. The Glick boy then returns as a vampire to claim his brother, Danny. After his funeral, the undead Danny infects a gravedigger, Mike Ryerson, and attempts to prey on one of his schoolfriends, Mark Petrie. However, Mark is a horror film buff and manages to repel Danny with a cross.

As the vampirism spreads, Mears, Burke, and Dr. Norton gradually realize what is happening to the town and attempt to stop it. Mears is attacked by Ralph and Danny's presumed-dead mother Marjorie Glick after she revives on a mortician's table, but Mears defends himself using a makeshift cross. Mark's parents are both killed by Barlow, though Mark escapes with the assistance of a local priest. Burke, however, suffers a severe heart attack following an encounter with the newly vampirized Ryerson.

Seeking revenge for his parents' deaths, Mark breaks into the Marsten House, and a concerned Susan follows him inside; both are soon captured by Straker. Later, Mears and Dr. Norton enter the house, too, where Straker kills Norton by impaling him on a pair of antlers before he himself is fatally shot by Mears. Afterwards, Mears and the freed Mark find Barlow's coffin in the cellar and destroy him by driving a stake through his heart. Fleeing the other vampires in the house (the infected townsfolk), the two set fire to the Marsten property as they leave, though Susan is nowhere to be found. While the house burns, the wind carries the fire towards the town itself. As he and Mark drive away from Salem's Lot, Mears comments that the fire will drive all the vampires from their hiding places and purify the town from the evil that has engulfed it.

The story returns to Mears and Mark at the church in Guatemala two years later. It becomes clear that they are on the run from the surviving Salem's Lot vampires, and that their bottles of holy water glow whenever a vampire is nearby. Realising that they have been tracked down yet again, Mears and Mark return to their lodgings to collect their belongings. Once there, Mears finds Susan lying in his bed. Now a vampire, she prepares to bite him as he leans down to kiss her, but instead Mears drives a stake through her heart and destroys her. A grief-stricken Mears then leaves with Mark, knowing that the vampires will continue to pursue them.

Cast

 David Soul as Ben Mears
 James Mason as Richard Straker
 Lance Kerwin as Mark Petrie
 Bonnie Bedelia as Susan Norton
 Lew Ayres as Jason Burke
 Ed Flanders as Bill Norton
 Fred Willard as Larry Crockett
 Julie Cobb as Bonnie Sawyer
 Kenneth McMillan as Constable Parkins Gillespie
 Geoffrey Lewis as Mike Ryerson
 Barney McFadden as Ned Tebbets
 Marie Windsor as Eva Miller
 Bonnie Bartlett as Ann Norton
 George Dzundza as Cully Sawyer
 Elisha Cook Jr. as Gordon "Weasel" Phillips
 Clarissa Kaye as Marjorie Glick
 Ned Wilson as Henry Glick
 Barbara Babcock as June Petrie
 Joshua Bryant as Ted Petrie
 James Gallery as Father Callahan
 Reggie Nalder as Kurt Barlow
 Brad Savage as Danny Glick
 Ronnie Scribner as Ralphie Glick

Production

Development

After Warner Bros. acquired the rights to Salem's Lot, the studio sought to turn the 400-page novel by Stephen King into a feature film, while still remaining faithful to the source material. Producer Stirling Silliphant, screenwriter Robert Getchell, and writer/director Larry Cohen all contributed screenplays but none proved satisfactory. "It was a mess," King said. "Every director in Hollywood who's ever been involved with horror wanted to do it, but nobody could come up with a script."

Eventually, the project was turned over to Warner Bros. Television and producer Richard Kobritz. Kobritz decided that, due to the novel's length, Salem's Lot would work better as a television miniseries than as a feature film. Television writer Paul Monash was contracted to write the teleplay. Monash was familiar with writing about small towns, as he had previously produced the film adaptation of King's novel Carrie and had worked on the television series, Peyton Place. Finally, a screening of The Texas Chain Saw Massacre (1974) resulted in Kobritz selecting Tobe Hooper as director.

With a budget of $4 million, principal photography began on July 10, 1979, in the Northern California town of Ferndale, with some scenes filmed at the Burbank studios. Filming officially wrapped on August 29, 1979.

Adaptation from source material
Though the miniseries follows the general outline of King's novel, there are a few substantial deviations for creative or logistical reasons. Many characters have been combined or merely deleted, as have certain subplots, and the character of Barlow is vastly different in the miniseries from how he is in the novel. However, Stephen King praised Paul Monash's screenplay and commented, "Monash has succeeded in combining the characters a lot, and it works."

Producer Richard Kobritz, who took a strong creative interest in his films, added several changes to Monash's script including turning the head vampire Kurt Barlow from a cultured human-looking villain into a speechless demonic-looking monster. Kobritz explained:

Other changes by Kobritz included having the final confrontation with Barlow in the cellar of the Marsten House whereas in the book it is in the basement of Eva Miller's boarding house, a concept Kobritz felt "Just doesn't work. I mean, from a point of sheer construction in a well-written screenplay, he's got to reside in the inside of the Marsten House. He's a major star in the picture – the third or fourth most important character – he's got to be there. It may have worked in the book, but not in the movie." Susan's death was also moved to the climax, to give her death "more impact and provide the film with a snap ending."

Casting
For the roles of Richard K. Straker and the vampire Kurt Barlow, James Mason and Reggie Nalder had been on producer Richard Kobritz's "wish list". Kobritz sent Mason a copy of the script, who loved the part and his wife, Clarissa Kaye-Mason, was also cast as Marjorie Glick. However, Nalder was less impressed. "The makeup and contact lenses were painful but I got used to them. I liked the money best of all."

The miniseries also features Elisha Cook Jr. as Weasel Philips and Marie Windsor as Eva Miller, two characters with a relationship. This casting was an inside joke by producer Kobritz, a fan of Stanley Kubrick; Cook and Windsor had previously played a couple in Kubrick's The Killing (1956).

Direction
Salem's Lot does not rely on the same kind of dynamics as The Texas Chain Saw Massacre.  "This film is very spooky – it suggests things and always has the overtone of the grave. It affects you differently than my other horror films. It's more soft-shelled," director Tobe Hooper explains. "A television movie does not have blood or violence. It has atmosphere which creates something you cannot escape – the reminder that our time is limited and all the accoutrements that go with it, such as the visuals."

Although Salem's Lot was aimed at television, a European theatrical release was also planned and which would include more violence. For example, two versions of the scene where Cully Sawyer threatens Larry Crockett with a shotgun were filmed. In one version, Larry holds the gun barrel in his mouth, while in the other, the barrel is in front of his face. "They worked at a feature film pace instead of a TV pace," recalled actor Lance Kerwin on the filming. "It's really even hard to tell the flow of the film. It was a miniseries originally, then we shot a feature film version for Europe at the same time. They've edited and cut together so much."

Design and effects

Unable to find a house in Ferndale that resembled the Marsten House from the book, an estimated $100,000 was spent on constructing a three-story facade over an already-existing house on a hillside, overlooking Ferndale and the Eel River Valley. Designed by Mort Rabinowitz, it took 20 days to build. Another $70,000 was spent on constructing the interior set of the house which proved even more difficult for designer Rabinowitz, who also designed the building of Straker's antique shop and the small village in Guatemala where the beginning and end of the miniseries is set.

The vampire makeup involving glowing contact lenses was invented by Jack Young. According to Tobe Hooper, the makeup on actor Reggie Nalder would constantly fall off, as well as the fake nails and teeth, and the contact lenses would go sideways. The contact lenses could only be worn for 15 minutes at a time before they had to be removed to let the eyes rest for 30 minutes.

The vampire levitations were accomplished by placing the actors on a boom crane instead of traditional wires: "We didn't fly our vampires in on wires, because even in the best of films you can see them," producer Richard Korbitz explained. "We wanted to get a feeling of floating. And the effect is horrific, because you know there are no wires. It has a very spooky, eerie quality to it." The levitation sequences were also shot-in-reverse [sic] to make the scenes more eerie.

Soundtrack
With producer Richard Kobritz wanting "a good, atmospheric, old-fashioned, Bernie Herrmann-type score", the score was composed and conducted by Harry Sukman, whom Korbitz described as "a former cohort and protege of Victor Young". The soundtrack to Salem's Lot is known to be Sukman's last work before passing in 1984. Waxwork Records released the soundtrack in 2016 on vinyl record for the first time.

Reception

Critical response
Broadcast reviews for Salem's Lot were largely positive, with critics praising the film's atmosphere, cinematography, Hooper's direction, and scares. Time Out called the film "surprisingly successful", highlighting the film's cinematography, atmosphere, and climax. Helen O'Hara of Empire Magazine awarded the film three out of five stars, stating that, although it "doesn’t quite nail the scale of the infection", the film's scares, special effects, pacing, and characters more than made up for it.

As of August 2022, it holds an approval rating of 89% on review aggregator Rotten Tomatoes, based on 18 reviews, and an average rating of 6.65/10. The site's critical consensus reads: "Director Tobe Hooper and a devilishly charismatic James Mason elevate this television adaptation of the Stephen King novel, injecting the vampiric tradition with fresh blood and lingering scares."

Awards and nominations

Legacy
In the years following its initial broadcast, Salem's Lot has accumulated a cult following and is now considered a classic. It has been included in multiple lists by several media outlets. Paste Magazine ranked the film at #64 in their list of "100 Best Vampire Movies of All Time". Variety listed it at #20 in their "Best and Worst Stephen King Adaptations".

Influence
Salem's Lot had a significant impact on the vampire genre, as it inspired horror films such as Fright Night (1985) and the scenes of vampire boys floating outside windows would be referenced in The Lost Boys (1987) (and later spoofed in The Simpsons episode "Treehouse of Horror IV"). Salem's Lot has also been cited as one of the primary influences for Joss Whedon's hit TV series Buffy the Vampire Slayer.

Writer Bryan Fuller stated that the scene where a character is impaled on a deer's antlers in Salem's Lot inspired him to do a similar scene in his 2013 TV series Hannibal because the original scene frightened him so much as a child.

Filmmaker Mike Flanagan's 2021 horror limited series Midnight Mass, is heavily inspired by both the novel and the miniseries. Like 'Salem's Lot, Midnight Mass centers around a small town where a former local returns after an extended period of time. The arrival of a strange new resident (in King's story, Straker, in Flanagan's series the substitute priest), and the revelation of the town being infected by vampires. The master vampire in Mass is modeled somewhat on the miniseries version, and also never speaks. The vampires eyes are also lifted from the miniseries.

Sequels and remakes
In 1987, Larry Cohen directed A Return to Salem's Lot, a sequel to the 1979 miniseries.

In 2004, TNT premiered a new version of Salem's Lot starring Rob Lowe, which also received a Primetime Emmy nomination for its music.

On April 23, 2019, New Line Cinema announced that a theatrical film based on the novel would be made, with Gary Dauberman and James Wan producing. Dauberman wrote the screenplay for It and It Chapter Two.
Dauberman was confirmed as director on April 10, 2020.

See also
 Vampire film
 List of vampire television series

References

External links 

 
 
 
Salem's Lot Then And Now

1979 American television series debuts
1979 American television series endings
American horror fiction television series
American horror television films
1970s American television miniseries
Television shows based on works by Stephen King
Films based on works by Stephen King
Films based on American horror novels
Films directed by Tobe Hooper
Films scored by Harry Sukman
Films set in Guatemala
Films set in Maine
Films shot in California
American vampire films
Vampires in television
CBS original programming
'Salem's Lot